Gavin O'Connor may refer to:
 Gavin O'Connor (actor) (born 1972), Irish actor
 Gavin O'Connor (director) (born 1964), American film director, screenwriter, producer, playwright and actor